Janette Husárová and Renata Voráčová were the defending champions, but Husárová chose not to participate. Therefore Voráčová partnered with Elena Bogdan and successfully defended her title defeating Marta Domachowska and Sandra Klemenschits in the final 7–6(7–2), 6–4.

Seeds

Draw

Draw

References
 Main Draw

Empire Trnava Cup - Doubles